The 2021 World Athletics Continental Tour, also known as the 2021 Continental Tour, is the second season of the annual series of outdoor track and field meetings, organised by World Athletics. The Tour forms the second tier of international one-day meetings after the Diamond League.

The Continental Tour is divided into three levels – Gold, Silver and Bronze – whose status is determined by the quality of competition and prize money on offer.

2021 Continental Tour gold level schedule

References

External links

2021
World Athletics Continental Tour